
Pisz County is a unit of territorial administration and local government (powiat) in Warmian-Masurian Voivodeship, northern Poland. It came into being on 1 January 1999 as a result of the Polish local government reforms passed in 1998.

As of 2006 its total population is 57,553, out of which the population of Pisz is 19,332, that of Orzysz is 5,804, that of Ruciane-Nida is 4,894, that of Biała Piska is 4,006, and the rural population is 23,517.

Neighbouring counties
Pisz County is bordered by Giżycko County to the north, Ełk County and Grajewo County to the east, Kolno County and Ostrołęka County to the south, Szczytno County to the west, and Mrągowo County to the north-west.

Administrative division
The county is subdivided into four gminas (all urban-rural, centred on the four towns). These are listed in the following table, in descending order of population.

References
Polish official population figures 2006

 
Pisz